California City Municipal Airport  is located in the city of California City, in the Fremont Valley of Kern County, California.

Facilities

See also
 List of airports in Kern County, California

References

External links 

Airports in Kern County, California
California City, California